Frank Conrad Baumholtz (October 7, 1918 – December 14, 1997) was an American professional baseball and basketball player. He was an outfielder for Major League Baseball's Cincinnati Reds (1947–49), Chicago Cubs (1949 and 1951–55) and Philadelphia Phillies (1956–57). He played two seasons of professional basketball for the Youngstown Bears of the National Basketball League during the 1945–46 season, and the Cleveland Rebels of the Basketball Association of America during the 1946–47 season. He was born in Midvale, Ohio.

College career
Baumholtz played college basketball at Ohio University, playing the guard position. Baumholtz was a first-team All-American in basketball in 1941, his senior year, leading the Bobcats to the finals of the 1941 National Invitation Tournament, the most prestigious tournament in the country at the time. He was named the tournament's most valuable player. His No. 54 jersey hangs from the rafters of the Convocation Center. It was retired on Feb. 4, 1995, which was declared "Frank Baumholtz Day" in the city of Athens, Ohio and on campus and was the only number so honored at the school until 2007 when Dave Jamerson and Walter Luckett had their jerseys retired as well.

Professional career

Basketball
He played two seasons of professional basketball. In the 1945–46 season, he suited up for the Youngstown Bears of the NBL. The following year, he played for the Cleveland Rebels of the fledgling Basketball Association of America, the direct predecessor to today's National Basketball Association. During the 1946–47 season, Baumholtz played in 45 games, averaging 14.0 points per game and being selected to the All-BAA Second Team.

Baseball
Baumholtz finished 5th in voting for the 1947 National League Rookie of the Year for playing in 151 Games and having 643 At Bats, 96 Runs, 182 Hits, 32 Doubles, 9 Triples, 5 Home Runs, 45 RBI, 6 Stolen Bases, 56 Walks, .283 Batting Average, .341 On-base percentage, .384 Slugging Percentage, 247 Total Bases and 11 Sacrifice Hits.

Baumholtz finished 17th in voting for the 1952 National League MVP for playing in 103 Games and having 409 At Bats, 59 Runs, 133 Hits, 17 Doubles, 4 Triples, 4 Home Runs, 35 RBI, 5 Stolen Bases, 27 Walks, .325 Batting Average, .371 On-base percentage, .416 Slugging Percentage, 170 Total Bases and 7 Sacrifice Hits.

In 10 seasons he played in 1,019 Games and had 3,477 At Bats, 450 Runs, 1,010 Hits, 165 Doubles, 51 Triples, 25 Home Runs, 272 RBI, 30 Stolen Bases, 258 Walks, .290 Batting Average, .342 On-base percentage, .389 Slugging Percentage, 1,352 Total Bases, 45 Sacrifice Hits, 10 Sacrifice Flies and 2 Intentional Walks. His career Fielding Percentage was .980 at all three Outfield positions.

Baumholtz had a memorable minor league season in 1950, batting .379 and collecting 254 hits in 172 games for the Los Angeles Angels of the Class AAA Pacific Coast League.

In contrast to radio's "Quiz Kids" or the 1950 Phillies "Whiz Kids", according to Chicago columnist Mike Royko Baumholtz was the anchor, as it were, of a 1950s Cubs outfield "that was so slow they were known as the Quicksand Kids." Hank Sauer and Ralph Kiner were in left and right fields respectively.

Baumholtz is one of 13 athletes to have played in both the  National Basketball Association and Major League Baseball. The thirteen are: Danny Ainge, Baumholtz, Hank Biasatti, Gene Conley, Chuck Connors, Dave DeBusschere, Dick Groat, Steve Hamilton, Mark Hendrickson, Cotton Nash, Ron Reed, Dick Ricketts and Howie Schultz.

Baumholtz died in Winter Springs, Florida at the age of 79.

BAA career statistics

Regular season

References

External links
Baseball

Frank Baumholtz at SABR (Baseball BioProject)
Frank Baumholtz at Baseball Almanac
Frank Baumholtz at Baseballbiography.com
Frank Baumholtz Chicago Cubs Photo

Basketball

 or, BAA Statistics at Basketball-Reference.com, or NBL Statistics at Basketball-Reference.com
Frank Baumholtz at Pro Basketball Encyclopedia
Frank Baumholtz  Ohio University: Top 10 100 Year Moments

1918 births
1997 deaths
All-American college men's basketball players
American men's basketball players
Basketball players from Ohio
Baseball players from Ohio
Cincinnati Reds players
Chicago Cubs players
Cleveland Rebels players
Guards (basketball)
Philadelphia Phillies players
Ogden Reds players
Major League Baseball right fielders
Ohio Bobcats baseball players
Ohio Bobcats men's basketball players
People from Tuscarawas County, Ohio
People from Winter Springs, Florida
Youngstown Bears players